von Bertouch is a surname. Notable people with the surname include:

Anne Von Bertouch (1915–2003), Australian artist and writer
Georg von Bertouch (1668–1743), German-born Norwegian Baroque composer
Laura von Bertouch (born 1980), Australian netball player
Natalie von Bertouch (born 1982), Australian netball player